Lagorrachi is a village and a community of the Katerini municipality. Before the 2011 local government reform it was part of the municipality of Elafina, of which it was a municipal district. The 2011 census recorded 557 inhabitants in the village. The community of Lagorrachi covers an area of 20.317 km2.

Administrative division
The community of Lagorrachi consists of two separate settlements. The village of Lagorrachi (454 inhabitants as of 2011) and Meliadi (103 inhabitants as of 2011).

References

See also
Elafina
Moschopotamos
List of settlements in the Pieria regional unit

Populated places in Pieria (regional unit)